Cauliflower is a 2021 Indian Telugu-language spoof movie starring Sampoornesh Babu, in a dual role. It revolves around laws about the need to protect man's chastity. In the times where men are held responsible for all the crimes against women, this movie offers for special laws for men.

Plot 

The movie starts with a British man, Andy Flower(Sampoornesh Babu) in the streets of a Telugu village, writing about the chastity of Indian women to take the records back to UK. He is taken to a brothel and is disturbed that women in India should be chaste. He marries the madam of the brothel and marries off the prostitutes to men. He fathers a son, Cauliflower(also Sampoornesh Babu) and decries that he should touch no one except the woman he is going to marry.

At present, Hyderabad city is bothered by chain robbery cases, who leave Rum bottles after they rob people. CM appoints a special police officer, Singh to investigate the matter. He deduces that Rum gang is a trio of women called Ramba, Urvasi and Menaka. They rob people by luring them and into buying a doll fitted with a pin hole camera which records the video and voice, thus knowing their profile. The scene shifts to Cauliflower's village, where he is now the head of the village and makes a law that every living being, including animals should have only one partner. He even marries off two buffaloes. One day, a young man is caught staring a sixty year old lady, to which Cauliflower marries of the two. Meanwhile, his sister-in-law constantly urges Cauliflower and her mother for their marriage. But his mother rejects that he isn't 35 years old yet, the age of marriage as per their family traditions. Meanwhile, to seek revenge, the young man and the gang throw a cobra at his sister-in-law. Cauliflower, while saving her from snake, looks at her naked. That day, the whole village gathers for a panchayati and Cauliflower judges that he marry his sister-in-law the same night. That night, while on his way to marry, he encounters the same trio of ladies who ridicule and gang rape him.

He goes to police station, court and legislative assembly, where he  sits invariably to seek justice arguing that man's chastity is equally important as women's, but to no avail. A local media catches his attention. After an initial setback, he receives support from women, men and the old alike. The police, on C.M's order beat and strip him naked. One S.I takes pity and offers him a pair of pants and takes Cauliflower his home. He then requests C.M for a new machine to be designed and the city women kiss it so that he may recognize who raped him. The trio continue their robberies, including from a girl who is being helped by Sonu Sood for her mother's operation. The trio and Singh are revealed to the birds of same flock, planning to escape to Bangkok. The trio manage to evade the kissing machine by replacing one of them with the S.I's wife with Singh helping them. The girl spots the trio, when one of them finds that her passport is replaced with Singh's, and is chased by them, who in turn are chased by Cauliflower. After they manage to escape, Cauliflower accidentally nabs them and takes them to court.

The trio are represented by a woman lawyer who accuses Cauliflower of misogynist when he claims that he was raped. Cauliflower gives an emotional speech about how a man's birth is only celebrated and is sidelined after he is born and his sacrifices for the family. His rhetoric melts several people's hearts, including the judge's wife. Before the judge can give any punishment, the three girls accept the mistake that they exploited men for their own selfishness. The judge then requests to higher court that a law be made to protect man's chastity with par women's.

Later the S.I asks how the beautiful trio gang raped him and forces Cauliflower to explain what precisely happened that day. To everyone's surprise, Cauliflower reveals that he was only kissed and that without a formal sex education, he assumed kissing led to loss of chastity and birth of children.

Cast 
Sampoornesh Babu (dual role) Andy Flower and Cauliflower
Getup Seenu as an assistant to Andy Flower and care taker of Cauliflower
Posani Krishna Murali   as S.I

Reception 
Sreedhar Marati of Telugu Bulletin said actor Sampurnesh Babu "...gave a decent performance in the lead role. His facial expressions and comic timing in a few episodes will evoke good fun. His acting at the state assembly with only a cauliflower on his body will attract the audience to an extent." Other actors he said were just "okay".  Overall, he said the film had an "Uneven screenplay added with depth less proceedings makes the film a boring watch during this weekend."

Sri Latha of 24 News Daily said "Sampoo as Cauliflower evokes good fun. His body language is quite funny" and that "All the supporting cast also tried very hard to make a difference" but that "The satirical comedy was shown in excess and this creates a boring factor for the audience" and "The concept of the film is so silly".

References 

2020s Telugu-language films
2021 comedy films
Indian comedy films